"Arroja la bomba" ("Throw the bomb") was one of the most popular anarchist songs of the Republican faction during the Spanish Civil War (1936-1939).

It is believed that it was composed in the dungeons of the Superior Police Delegation of Barcelona, in 1932, by an Aragonese anarchist named Aznar, in response to the brutal interrogations and torture to which he was subjected. Since the original version of the song was too aggressive for non-violent anarchists, a moderated version was created, sometimes called "Luchemos obreros" ("Let's fight/struggle workers"). There is also an Italian version of the song called "Mano alla bomba" ("Hand on the bomb").

Lyrics

Original version

Moderated version (Luchemos obreros)

Italian version

References 

Anarchism in Spain
1932 in Spain
1932 songs